Alexander McNab (27 December 1894 – 3 April 1960) was a Scottish-American soccer player and coach. He began his career in Scotland before moving to the United States. In the US, he won six consecutive National Challenge Cups with teams from both the American Soccer League and St. Louis Soccer League. He was inducted into the National Soccer Hall of Fame in 2005.

Scotland

Greenock Morton
McNab began his career with Greenock Morton in 1914, playing nine seasons with the team until his departure for the United States in 1924. On 27 April 1922, Morton won the Scottish Cup, winning in the final against Rangers. In 1924, Morton offered McNab £4 per week. He considered this excessively low, but when he asked for a transfer, the club placed a prohibitively high fee on him to force him to stay in Greenock. When McNab received an offer from the Boston Soccer Club of the American Soccer League to play for £12 per week, McNab immediately left Scotland for the United States.

National team
McNab earned two caps with the Scottish national team. His first was a 2–0 away win over Ireland on 26 February 1921 and the second was a 3–0 victory over England on 9 April 1921.

United States

American Soccer League
McNab became an immediate success with the Boston Soccer Club. In 1925, the team defeated the Ben Millers of the St. Louis Soccer League in an unofficial national championship series. After finishing second in the league in 1926 and 1927, Boston finally took the ASL title in 1928 to go with their 1925 and 1927 league cups. By that time, McNab was partnered on Boston's front line with Billy Gonsalves and Bill McPherson, forming what was known as the "golden triangle". In 1928, McNab left Boston for the Fall River Marksmen. Over the next three season, the Marksmen took three league titles as well as the 1930 and 1931 National Challenge Cups. The 1931 Challenge Cup, pitting Fall River against Chicago Sparta was tied after two game, forcing a decisive third game. However, McNab broke his arm the day before the decisive game and Fall River was forced to play with ten men as they had failed to bring substitutes to Chicago. In 1931, the Marksmen merged with the New York Soccer Club to form the New York Yankees. After one season, they moved to New Bedford, becoming the New Bedford Whalers. The Whalers proceeded to win the 1931 and spring 1932 seasons as well as the 1932 National Challenge Cup over Stix, Baer and Fuller F.C. (SBF) of the St. Louis Soccer League.

St. Louis
The Whalers victory over SBF in the 1932 Challenge Cup brought an offer from the SBF ownership to move west. McNab took the offer, inducing both Gonsalves and McPherson to join him at SBF. They formed the core of a team which took the 1933 and 1934 Challenge Cups. In 1934, St. Louis Central Breweries took over sponsorship of the team, renaming it appropriately enough, St. Louis Central Breweries F.C. In 1935, McNab won his sixth straight Challenge Cup with Central Breweries. That year the team was renamed the St. Louis Shamrocks. However, the Shamrocks withdrew from the SLSL, competing in the St. Louis Major League, the city's second division. In 1936, McNab and his teammates went to yet another National Cup final, falling this time to the Philadelphia German-Americans. In 1937, McNab went to his eighth straight National Cup final, losing this one to the New York Nationals. Following this loss, the Shamrocks where disbanded. McNab then signed with South Side Radio. In December 1937, McNab gained his release from South Side and signed with St. Matthew's of the SLSL, playing the 1937–1938 season with them. On 30 October 1938, he signed with Burke's Undertakers for the 1938–1939 season.

Coaching
The move to Stix, Baer and Fuller F.C. brought McNab into the coaching ranks. He immediately proved he was as good a coach as a player, taking SBF to two consecutive league and National Challenge Cup titles.

Non-playing career
In addition to playing and coaching soccer, McNab worked as an engineer in Scotland, and as a sporting goods salesman for the Stix, Baer and Fuller department store in St. Louis after retiring from playing.

National Soccer Hall of Fame
The National Soccer Hall of Fame inducted McNab in 2005 as part of a process of recognising significant pre-1950s players. According to the Hall of Fame, "We were aware that in the early decades of the Hall of Fame a number of outstanding players had slipped through the cracks of the selection process. In order to correct these oversights we established a Blue Ribbon panel consisting of historians Colin Jose, Roger Allaway and Hall of Famer Walter Bahr, to review the credentials of all Veterans from the pre-NASL era. Out of a total of 150 players who met the eligibility criteria, the panel unanimously recommended, and the Board approved, the special induction of these five players." McNab was among the five selected.

McNab died in 1960 when he suffered a heart attack playing golf. His son Peter McNab later played in the second American Soccer League.

References

External links
 National Soccer Hall of Fame profile

1894 births
1960 deaths
Scottish footballers
Scotland international footballers
Greenock Morton F.C. players
American Soccer League (1921–1933) players
Boston Soccer Club players
Fall River Marksmen players
New York Yankees (soccer) players
New Bedford Whalers players
St. Louis Soccer League players
Stix, Baer and Fuller F.C. players
St. Louis Central Breweries players
St. Louis Shamrocks players
St. Louis South Side Radio players
Burke's Undertakers players
National Soccer Hall of Fame members
Footballers from Inverclyde
People from Gourock
Association football outside forwards
British emigrants to the United States
Scottish Football League players